The 1962 Asia Badminton Championships was the 1st tournament of the Badminton Asia Championships. It was held May 1962 in Kuala lumpur, Malaysia.

Medalists

Medal table

Final results

Semifinal results

References 

2. 

1962 in badminton
1962 in Malayan sport
Badminton Asia Championships
Badminton tournaments in Malaysia
Sports competitions in Kuala Lumpur